Springbrook is a hamlet in central Alberta, Canada within Red Deer County. Springbrook is also recognized by Statistics Canada as a designated place.

Springbrook was home of the Penhold Air Cadet Summer Training Centre (PACSTC). The PACSTC was formerly RCAF Station Penhold.

Demographics 

See also 
List of communities in Alberta
List of designated places in Alberta
List of hamlets in Alberta

References 

Hamlets in Alberta
Designated places in Alberta
Red Deer County